Nonthaburi Province Stadium, Nonthaburi Sports Complex Stadium is a multi-purpose stadium in Nonthaburi Province , Thailand.  It is currently used mostly for football matches and is the home stadium of Nonthaburi.  The stadium holds 10,000 people.

References

Football venues in Thailand
Multi-purpose stadiums in Thailand
Buildings and structures in Nonthaburi province
Sport in Nonthaburi province